Max Rüegg is a Swiss bobsledder who competed in the early 1980s. He won four medals at the FIBT World Championships with a gold (Two-man: 1982,  a silver (Two-man: 1983) and two bronzes (Four-man: 1981, 1982).

He is the brother of Tony Rüegg and the uncle of Reto Rüegg, Ivo Rüegg and Ralph Rüegg, all of whom have also competed in bobsleigh.

References
Bobsleigh two-man world championship medalists since 1931
Bobsleigh four-man world championship medalists since 1930

Living people
Swiss male bobsledders
Year of birth missing (living people)
20th-century Swiss people